Chisocheton amabilis is a tree in the family Meliaceae. The bark is grey-green. The fragrant flowers are white, sometimes pink-tipped. The specific epithet  is from the Latin meaning "lovely". Habitat is peatswamp and riparian forests from sea-level to  altitude. C. amabilis is found in Sumatra, Peninsular Malaysia and Borneo.

References

amabilis
Plants described in 1868
Trees of Sumatra
Trees of Peninsular Malaysia
Trees of Borneo
Taxa named by Friedrich Anton Wilhelm Miquel